Moremi Ajasoro (Yoruba: Mọremí Àjàṣorò) was a legendary Yoruba queen and folk heroine in the Yorubaland region of present-day southwestern Nigeria who is assisted in the liberation of the Yoruba kingdom of Ife from the neighbouring Ugbo Kingdom.

Moremi was married to Oranmiyan, the son of Oduduwa, the first king of Ife.

Biography
The Ayaba (Queen Consort) Moremi lived in the 12th century, hailed from Offa, and was married to Oranmiyan, the heir to the king of Ife and son of the founding father of the Yoruba people, Oduduwa. Ile-Ife was a kingdom that was said to have been at war with an adjoining tribe who were known to them as the Forest people. (Ugbò in the Yoruba language, though the said tribe is believed by scholars to have had no relation to the contemporary Ugbòs of modern Nigeria). Scores of Ife citizens were being enslaved by these people, and because of this they were generally regarded with disdain by the Yoruba city-states. Although the people of Ile-Ife were furious about their raids, they did not have the means to defend themselves. This is because the invaders were seen as spirits by the people of Ife, appearing as masquerades completely covered in raffia leaves.

Queen Moremi was a courageous, brave and beautiful woman who, in order to deal with the problem facing her people, pledged a great sacrifice to the Spirit of the river Esimirin so that she could discover the strength of her nation's enemies. Following the incessant raids and with Ife under siege, she took the heroic step of offering herself to be captured by the raiders. She was then taken as a slave by the Ugbo, and due to her beauty and Esimirin's help, she married their ruler as his anointed queen. After familiarizing herself with the secrets of her new husband's army, she escaped to Ile-Ife and revealed this to the Yorubas, who were then able to subsequently defeat them in battle using the intelligence she provided.

Following the war she returned to her first husband, King Oramiyan of Ife (and later Oyo), who immediately had her re-instated as his queen. Moremi returned to the Esimirin river to fulfill her pledge. The river demanded she sacrifice of her only son, Oluorogbo. The demand was inconceivable, and Moremi pleaded with the god for a less terrible offering to be accepted. In the end, however, she kept her promise and paid the price. The offering of Oluorogbo to the river god grieved not only Moremi but the whole kingdom of Ife. Its people consoled Queen Moremi by offering to be her eternal children as a replacement for the child she lost - a promise kept by them until today.

Legacy
The Edi Festival was started shortly after Moremi's death to celebrate the sacrifice she made for the Yoruba people. More recently, Queen Moremi: The Musical - a theatrical story of love, faith, honour and the ultimate sacrifice - has also been produced. 

Various public places are named after her in the contemporary Yorubaland region of Nigeria, such as Moremi High School and the female residence halls at the University of Lagos and Obafemi Awolowo University.

In 2017, Oba Ogunwusi, the Ooni of Ile-Ife, Osun State, erected a statue of Moremi in his palace. The statue is the tallest in Nigeria, displacing the previous holder of that record (a statue in Owerri, the Imo State capital). It is also the fourth tallest in Africa.

In literature and media

Moremi's story has inspired many literary adaptations and dramas. A unique adaptation is a comic book titled "Moremi: An African Legend" under the 'An African Legend' comic series. It was published in 2021 using the popular bande dessinee style to appeal to younger audiences.

References

Yoruba history
Yoruba queens
Nigerian royalty
African women in war
Nigerian princesses
Yoruba princesses
History of women in Nigeria
Women in 12th-century warfare
12th-century Nigerian women
People from Ife
People from Kwara State
Princesses by marriage